is a 2013 Japanese twelve-part science fiction comedy television miniseries adapted from the seinen manga series Minna! Esper Dayo! written and illustrated by Kiminori Wakasugi. It aired on TV Tokyo from April 12 to July 5, 2013. The show's theme song is Japanese-language song "(Where's) The Silent Majority?" by the Japanese singer-songwriter Yu Takahashi. It was followed by a 2015 TV special titled All Esper Dayo! SP.

Plot 
Yoshirō Kamogawa, a student at East Mikawa High School in Aichi Prefecture, discovers that he has psychic powers. Over the course of the series he discovers that he and his childhood friend Miyuki both have telepathic powers, Mr. Teru who operates the local Seahorse café has the power of telekinesis, senior Yōsuke Enomoto has the power of teleportation, student outcast Yabe has the power of clairvoyance, Hideo is a psychometer, Ms. Nastume and Mr. Hayashi have telekinesis, Pao can hypnotize people, and others in the town have powers as well. Yoshirō finds that many seek to use their newfound powers for perverted and trivial pursuits, but Yoshirō himself dreams of using his powers to protect his crush, the new transfer student Sae Asami who transferred in from Tokyo, and ultimately save the world. Meanwhile, a pair of ESP researchers who have been laughed out of Tokyo University visit the town to study the people with these powers and to stop them from being destroyed by evil psychics.

Cast 

Shōta Sometani as Yoshirō Kamogawa
Kaho as Miyuki Hirano
Erina Mano as Sae Asami
Makita Sports as Nagano Terumitsu a.k.a. Mr. Teru
Motoki Fukami as Yōsuke Enomoto
Tokio Emoto as Yasu
Megumi Kagurazaka as Akiyama Takako
Ken Yasuda as Prof. Asami
Sairi Itō as Yūko
Yui Murata as Rena
Mariko Tsutsui as Kamokawa's mom
Toshihiro Yashiba as Hayashi
Yoshiki Saitō as Takeshi
Masashi Tada as Kazuo
Ijirī Okada as Kamokawa's dad
Adam Torel as Sergei
Yūsuke Yamanaka as Masaru
Hirotaka Kurihara as Kōji
Kōhei Takeda as Ezaki
Akiyoshi Nakao as Kayama
Yūya Ishikawa as Teacher
Ayaka Morita as Meme Natsume
Louis Kurihara as Mitsuru
Kenichirō Mogi as Mogi
Kyōko Aizome as Auntie
Reiya Masaki as Yabe Naoya
Suzunosuke as Hideo Ishizaki
Ryōko Nagoshi as Hersel
Aoba Kawai
Mamiko Itō
Yoshino Imamura as Hashi
Atom Shimojō as Saijō
Sanae Miyata as Hideo's mom
Sion Sono
Jyonmyon Pe as Maru
Takuma Iwasaki as Tetsuya
Sayaka Tashiro as Mariko
Yūsuke Matsumoto as Young Hideo
Shōko Tamimoto
Yukiko Takenaka
Erī Arai
Waki Katakura
Shōko Takasaki
Saki Oppata
Machi Ariake
Haruyo Ushimaru
Runa Kamiya
Azusa Shiina
Rina Sugihara
Machi Ariake
Mayu
Asu Tatematsu

Episodes

Production
The series is the first adaptation of the seinen manga series Minna! Esper Dayo! written and illustrated by Kiminori Wakasugi. It was followed by a 2015 TV special directed by Sion Sono with much of the same cast but without Kaho. A 2015 theatrical film adaptation of the source material, titled The Virgin Psychics, was also directed by Sion Sono but had some changes in casting.

Broadcast
The series premiered on TV Tokyo on April 12, 2013, and ran weekly episodes (with the exception of May 17) until its twelfth and final episode aired on July 5, 2013.

Home video
The TV series was made available for purchase on DVD and Blu-ray from TV Tokyo on August 23, 2013. The DVD box costs 15,200 yen and the Blu-ray box costs 19,000 yen. Extras include a documentary about Sion Sono and a special about the making of the series.

References

External links 
 

Japanese television miniseries
2013 in Japanese television
Japanese science fiction television series
Japanese television dramas based on manga
Japanese comedy television series
Japanese high school television series
2013 Japanese television series debuts
2013 Japanese television series endings
TV Tokyo original programming
Television series about teenagers
Television shows set in Aichi Prefecture